Kamiohsu Dam is a rockfill dam located in Gifu Prefecture in Japan. The dam is used for power production. The catchment area of the dam is 12 km2. The dam impounds about 45  ha of land when full and can store 14500 thousand cubic meters of water. The construction of the dam was started on 1976 and completed in 1995.

References

Dams in Gifu Prefecture
Dams completed in 1995
1995 establishments in Japan